Alexander Barclay (c. 1476–1552) was an English/Scottish poet. 

Alexander Barclay may also refer to:

Alexander Barclay (apothecary) (d. 1608) Scottish herbalist
Alexander Barclay (frontiersman) (1810–1855), British trader in the American West and partner of Teresita Sandoval
Alexander Charles Barclay (1823–1893), English brewer and Liberal politician

See also
Alex Barclay (born 1974), Irish crime writer
Xander Berkeley (born 1955), American actor